The following list includes settlements, geographic features, and political subdivisions of Arkansas whose names are derived from Native American languages.

Listings

Counties

 Arkansas County, Arkansas – from the Illinois rendering of the tribal autonym kką:ze, which the Miami and Illinois used to refer to the Quapaw.
 Arkansas River
 Mississippi County, Arkansas
 Mississippi River
 Ouachita County, Arkansas – named after the Ouachita people.
 Village of Ouachita
 Lake Ouachita
 Ouachita River
 Ouachita Mountains
 Ouachita National Forest

Settlements

 Alabam
 Old Alabam
 Arkadelphia
 Bayou Township (Ashley County)
 Bayou Township (Baxter County)
 Bayou Meto (Arkansas County)
 Bayou Meto (Lonoke County)
 Caddo Gap
 Caddo Valley
 Caddo River
 Cherokee Village – named after the Cherokee people.
 Chickalah
 Choctaw
 Cozahome
 Hatchie Coon
 Havana
 Illinois Township (Pope County)
 Illinois Township (Washington County)
 Kentucky
 Little Arkansaw
 Modoc
 Newnata
 Northern Ohio
 Omaha
 Oneida
 Oppelo
 Osage
 Osage Mills
 Osceola
 Pocahontas
 Saginaw
 Saratoga
 Solgohachia – from the Choctaw word sok-ko-huch-cha, meaning "muscadine river".
 Tennessee
 Texarkana
 Tokalon
 Tomahawk
 Tomato
 Wabash
 Wabbaseka
 Wappanocca
 Winona

Bodies of Water
 Camp Kia Kima Lake
 Meneshea Lake
 Nacoosa Paper Retention Pond
 Patocca Lower Lake and Patocca Upper Lake

See also
List of place names in the United States of Native American origin

References

Citations

Sources

 

 
 
Place names